= How to Draw Cool Stuff =

Self help drawing guide series

- Author: Catherine V. Holmes
- Language: English
- Series: How to Draw Cool Stuff
- Subject: Drawing / Illustrations
- Genre: Self Help, Drawing
- Publisher: Library Tales Publishing
- Publication date: 2014, 2015, 2016
- Publication place: United States
- Media type: Print
- Pages: 254
- ISBN: 978-0615991429

How to Draw Cool Stuff is a series of bestselling self help drawing guides written and illustrated by Catherine V. Holmes and published by Library Tales Publishing. The first book in the series was published in 2014 with subsequent titles released in 2015 and 2016. The series was created to help teach potential artists the basic principles of illustration by concentrating on easy-to-learn shapes that build into complex drawings. Each book contains a series of hands-on exercises that illustrate lines, shapes, space and other elements in everyday objects and turn them into detailed works of art in what the book claims are "just a few simple steps take you a long way all you need is an apple"

The How to Draw Cool Stuff book series received wide acclaim and became a favorite among bloggers and art book reviewers, shortly after its launch in 2013. Art book magazine "Readers Favorites" gave the series 5 out of 5 stars and "I MUST READ" magazine chose the book as one of 21 Best Drawing Books For Beginners.
